This is a list of launch complexes where a Launch complex is a facility from which different types of launch vehicles are launched. It may contain one or more launch pads or suitable sites to mount a transportable launch pad.

Ariane Launch Complex (1970—)
Baikonur Cosmodrome Launch Complex 1 (1957—)
Cape Canaveral Air Force Station Launch Complex 1 (1955—1960), used during development of the SM-62 Snark Intercontinental Cruise Missile
Cape Canaveral Air Force Station Launch Complex 34 (1961—1968), used by the Apollo program
Cape Canaveral Launch Complex 36 (1962—2005), leased by Blue Origin since 2015 and under reconstruction as a New Glenn launch site
Green River Launch Complex (1964—1975) in Utah for Athena/ABRES testing of reentry vehicles to White Sands
Kennedy Space Center Launch Complex 39
39A (1967—), leased by SpaceX since 2014 and modified to support its launch vehicles
39B (1969—2009), now reconfigured for NASA's Space Launch System and Artemis program
39C (2015—), dedicated to small-lift launch vehicles
Osaki Launch Complex (1975—1992)
Pacific Spaceport Complex – Alaska (1998—)
Point Arguello Launch Complex A (1959—1966) and B (1960—1963) launch facilities for sounding rockets
Satish Dhawan Space Centre (1979—)
Snark Missile Launch Complex (1959—1961) at the Presque Isle Air Force Base, the SM-62 Snark's only operational launch complex
Soyuz Launch Complex (2011—) at the French Guiana Space Centre
Taiyuan Launch Complex 1 (1988—2009) for Long March rockets
Titan II ICBM Launch Complex 374-7
Vandenberg AFB Probe Launch Complex C (1971—1975), sounding rockets launch facility
Vandenberg AFB Space Launch Complex 3 (1960—) Atlas V launch site for high-inclination orbits such as polar or Sun-synchronous ones
  White Sands Launch Complex 33 (1971—1975), a post-World War II launching site for V-2 rockets listed on the US National Register of Historic Places
White Sands Launch Complex 36 (1958—2008), the Cold War site for Black Brant IX and 9CM1 launches, later used for NASA's sounding rockets program
White Sands Launch Complex 37 (1964—1992), the Cold War site for Nike Hercules rockets
White Sands Launch Complex 38 (1960-1063), the Cold War site for Nike Zeus testing
Yoshinobu Launch Complex (1994—)
Xichang Launch Complex 2 (1990—)

See also

 List of rocket launch sites
 Launch pad
 Space landing complex
 
 
 
 
 LC (disambiguation)
 Launch (disambiguation)
 Complex (disambiguation)

launch